Maverick is a model–view–controller (MVC) framework for the Java platform.

Technology
Maverick allows developing web applications in a very structured, modular and reusable way (thanks to its respect to the MVC pattern).

As is common Maverick uses a single servlet entry point.  It concentrates on MVC logic leaving other technologies for presentation support. It is highly configurable, but can be difficult to manage in large applications.

Maverick.NET 

Maverick.NET is a port that have been made of Maverick to the Microsoft .NET Framework.

References

See also
Struts
Java EE

External links
Official project page

Free software programmed in Java (programming language)